Barnala Khurd is a village in Shaheed Bhagat Singh Nagar district of Punjab State, India. Kalan is Persian language word which means Big and Khurd is Persian word which means small when two villages have same name then it is distinguished as Kalan means Big and Khurd means Small with Village Name. The village is administrated by Sarpanch an elected representative of the village.

Demography 
As of 2011, Barnala Khurd has a total number of 58 houses and population of 339 of which 187 include are males while 152 are females according to the report published by Census India in 2011. The literacy rate of Barnala Khurd is 72.29%, higher than the state average of 75.84%. The population of children under the age of 6 years is 25 which is 7.37% of total population of Barnala Khurd, and child sex ratio is approximately 471 as compared to Punjab state average of 846.

Most of the people are from Schedule Caste which constitutes 17.99% of total population in Barnala Khurd. The town does not have any Schedule Tribe population so far.

As per the report published by Census India in 2011, 99 people were engaged in work activities out of the total population of Barnala Khurd which includes 89 males and 10 females. According to census survey report 2011, 85.86% workers describe their work as main work and 14.14% workers are involved in Marginal activity providing livelihood for less than 6 months.

Education 
Sikh National College Banga and Amardeep Singh Shergill Memorial college Mukandpur are the nearest colleges.

List of schools nearby Barnala Khurd:
Guru Nanak Public School, Sakopur
Shiv Chand Public School, Sakopur
Adarsh Bal Vidhalya, Aur
Kirpal Sagar Academy, Bairsal

Transport 

See also 
List of villages in India

References

External links 
 Tourism of Punjab 
 Census of Punjab
 Locality Based PINCode

Villages in Shaheed Bhagat Singh Nagar district